Top Chef Amateurs is an American reality competition series which premiered on July 1, 2021, on Bravo. It is a spin-off of the Top Chef television series, featuring home cooks instead of professional chefs. In each episode, two home cooks compete head-to-head in challenges drawn from previous seasons of Top Chef. Each amateur is paired with a past Top Chef contestant, who acts as an advisor and sous chef. The series is hosted by Gail Simmons, who also serves as head judge. The winner of each episode receives .

Production of Top Chef Amateurs began in October 2020 in Portland, Oregon, following filming for Top Chef: Portland. The show was filmed under the same COVID-19 guidelines, utilizing the same kitchen set established at the Portland Expo Center. The competitors were flown to Portland from across the United States, quarantined in their hotel rooms for several days, and tested several times for the coronavirus. Similar to Portland, Amateurs features Top Chef alumni as guest judges, who rotate between cooking with the contestants and judging alongside Simmons.

Contestants

Episodes

References

External links

Top Chef
Cooking competitions in the United States
Bravo (American TV network) original programming
2020s American cooking television series
2020s American reality television series
2021 American television series debuts
English-language television shows
Television series by Magical Elves
Reality television spin-offs
American television spin-offs
Television shows filmed in Oregon